The Adobe Originals program is a series of digital typefaces created by Adobe Systems from 1989 for professional use, intended to be of extremely high design quality while offering a large feature set across many languages. Many are strongly influenced by research into classic designs from the past and calligraphy. Adobe Originals fonts are sold separately or with Adobe products such as InDesign.

Adobe Originals fonts tend to offer an extensive feature set through the OpenType font format, such as optical sizes, automatic ligature insertion, small capitals, swashes, text and lining figures and kerning pair sets to fine-tune character spacing. They are accordingly common choices in fine printing and book design.

History
The Originals program was established in 1989, when Sumner Stone hired font designers Carol Twombly and Robert Slimbach. This period saw the growth of desktop publishing, at a point when printing and design was becoming more accessible. Adobe already had contracts to digitise and sell fonts by companies such as ITC, but felt that many of these designs had a somewhat dated appearance.

Early typefaces released included Utopia and Adobe Garamond, a reinterpretation of the Roman types of Claude Garamond and the italics of Robert Granjon. Slimbach developed the design to have a timeless, accurate appearance through visiting the Plantin-Moretus Museum in Antwerp and seeing books and original printing equipment from the 16th century. A parallel Adobe Originals program was developed to provide Japanese-language fonts, including the works of such designers as Masahiko Kozuka and Ryoko Nishizuka.

Groups of fonts

A particularly large group of Adobe designs was inspired by the decorative wood types of the nineteenth century. These were given names after types of wood and tree.

The series also includes a large number of eccentric display designs, some resembling the grunge typography movement of the 1990s, which used awkward and science-fiction style letterforms.

Recent activity
Adobe has published fewer original designs since around 2000, publishing other companies' designs through its Adobe Fonts (formerly Typekit) online sales program for Web fonts (and more recently, desktop fonts as well). However, the company still does publish original designs, including Thomas Phinney's Hypatia Sans and Slimbach's recent Trajan Sans, Adobe Text, Arno and Acumin. Several of these are very large designs with complex character sets, Acumin reportedly having been in development for eight years and expanded in conception from four fonts to ninety.

Adobe has also released a large group of fonts, the Source family, as an open-source project that can be freely redistributed.

List of Adobe Originals families

OpenType conversion
When Adobe converted PostScript Type 1 and multiple master fonts to OpenType Compact Font Format (CFF), they were based on the last Type 1/MM versions from the Adobe Type Library. In addition to file format change, there were numerous other changes:
 For fonts designed by Robert Slimbach for Adobe, some received major redesigns (notably Cronos), while most were re-spaced and re-kerned.
 Some formerly all-capitals fonts such as Lithos Pro and Trajan Pro, received previously non-existent small-caps glyphs in the slots for lowercase characters.
 All alphabetic fonts which did not already have a euro symbol had one added.
 All alphabetic fonts added 16 extra characters: 14 Mac "symbol substitution" characters, the litre and estimated symbols. Symbol substitution was a scheme used on Mac OS, wherein for certain characters input using a Type 1 font with standard encoding, both screen and print would pull a generic version of the glyph in the Times style from the Symbol font. In OpenType, Adobe put customized versions of the formerly generic symbol substitution glyphs in every font, with a different appearance and metric in each font. The new glyphs include partialdiff, Delta (math), integral, pi (math), product (capital math pi), root, infinity, lozenge (diamond), summation (cap math Sigma), approxequal, ohm (capital math Omega), lessequal, greaterequal.
 Unkerned accented characters received additional kerning to deal with accented characters.
 Font families that formerly included separate Type 1 "Expert" fonts or Cyrillic fonts had these glyphs merged into the base fonts in their OpenType versions.
 Multiple master fonts were converted to individual OpenType fonts; each font consists of a former multiple master instance.

As a result of the changes, Adobe does not guarantee metric compatibility between Type 1 and OpenType fonts.

See also
 Adobe Font Folio
 Adobe Fonts
 Adobe Type

References

External links
 Adobe Originals
 Adobe Type Specimen Books
 Designers of Adobe Originals
 Optical Size and Typefounding at Adobe

Typography
Lists of typefaces
Typefaces with optical sizes
Typefaces with text figures
Adobe typefaces